Primorsky District ( "Seaside District") is a district of the federal city of St. Petersburg, Russia. As of the 2010 Census, its population was 507,238; up from 393,960 recorded in the 2002 Census.

Municipal divisions
Primorsky District comprises the municipal settlement of Lisy Nos and the following seven municipal okrugs:
#65
Chyornaya rechka
Kolomyagi
Komendantsky Aerodrom
Lakhta-Olgino
Ozero Dolgoye
Yuntolovo

References

Notes

Sources



 
States and territories established in 1936